The Man from U.N.C.L.E. gun often referred to as the U.N.C.L.E. Special is a fictional firearm depicted on the popular TV show The Man from U.N.C.L.E. which ran from September 1964 until it was canceled mid-season in 1968. Onscreen it was semi-automatic pistol that could be converted to a carbine-sniper rifle that could fire full automatic.

History
The series began as a feature-length television pilot film written by Sam Rolfe titled Solo that was filmed in late November 1963. In the film Napoleon Solo carried a standard Luger pistol which in one scene he called an "X-38 Automatic".

Stanley Weston, who had handled the toy licensing rights for Dr. Kildare, another  MGM Television series produced  by Norman Felton, was engaged to do the same for the show retitled The Man From U.N.C.L.E..  After viewing the Solo pilot in February, 1964, Weston wrote a letter to Felton expressing excitement over the show's merchandising potential. Weston made a list of 35 suggestions for emblem designs and spy gadgets that could be exploited for marketing purposes. Among them was the proposal for a distinctive pistol that should feature a silencer. "Also, from our viewpoint," Weston added, "it would be great if Solo uses a machine gun from time to time".

The U.N.C.L.E. Special was originally based on a 1934 7.65mm German Mauser pistol. While early episodes were being shot, the Mauser jammed frequently, and visually all the accessories added to convert the pistol to a carbine seemed to overwhelm the small pistol. It was soon replaced by the Walther P38 9mm Parabellum that the producers borrowed from the Combat! television series that was also shot on the MGM backlot. The standard barrel of the P-38 was shortened and modified to accept a bird-cage flash suppressor. The Special was depicted on screen as firing "sleep darts". Although the non-lethal feature of the gun was always the intent of its creators, this was not always clearly shown to the audience especially in later seasons, and as producers changed.

For situations where more firepower was necessary, the concealable pistol was modified to accept a barrel extension with hand-grip and silencer, a Phantom Bushnell pistol scope, an extended magazine and a collapsible shoulder stock. The bird cage suppressor, silencer and barrel extension were attached by threaded plugs. Though a sophisticated weapon on screen, the U.N.C.L.E. Special Carbine in reality could not shoot real bullets, only blanks. However the pistol alone was still a working firearm. It was also modified by the studio to allow it to fire in full automatic "machine gun" mode. Unfortunately, this caught the attention of the US Treasury Department- the manufacture of automatic weapons without a license is very illegal, and the show nearly had the guns confiscated. In the end MGM was fined $2000 and the matter was closed.

The prop masters of the series created six U.N.C.L.E. Specials at a cost of approximately $1,500 per gun, but only two had the full array of attachments.

In the episodes, the gun(s) were used by Napoleon Solo and Illya Kuryakin. The gun was extremely popular with viewers. MGM began to get fan mail addressed to "The Gun." At one point the gun was getting 500 letters per week. A US Army Ordinance General once asked if a few of the guns were available, he would like to borrow them for testing as possible weapons for the armed forces.

The UNCLE Special in popular culture

Reuben Klamer of Toylab designed a cap firing toy version of the weapon that included a bipod for the Ideal Toy Company as the "Napoleon Solo Gun" and also designed an "Illya Kuryankin" gun based on the AR-7.
Larami offered a Z-Matic toy P-38 in the early 1980s with the scope molded onto the non-working slide.  The pistol was offered both by itself and with a carbine barrel that slid over the stock pistol barrel, a detachable scope and a detachable stock.

RMI (Replica Models Incorporated) offered the U.N.C.L.E. P-38 variant with all the silencer, extended magazine, stock and scope accessorie along with a shoulder holster, in their early 1970's catalog.
Constructed of metal, with black plastic grips.  Pulling the trigger moved the slide back, chambered a solid brass round, and ejected it, repeating the process for each trigger pull.

In 1983, a toy U.N.C.L.E. gun that could fire rubber projectiles and convert into a robot action figure was made in Japan as part of Takara's Microman line under the name "MC-13 Gun Robo Walther P38 U.N.C.L.E."
In 1984, the Microman "MC-13 Gun Robo Walther P38 U.N.C.L.E." toy mentioned above was imported to the US by Hasbro and renamed to create the original Transformers character Megatron. This version of the toy was modified to disable the projectile firing mechanism, and stickers were added to identify the toy as a Decepticon.
By 2011, fans of The Man from U.N.C.L.E. had created an actual, live-firing gun based on the show version.

Notes

Further reading
Heitland, Jon. The Man From U.N.C.L.E. Book: The Behind-the-Scenes Story of a Television Classic, Macmillan 1987

External links
Internet Movie Firearms Database

Fictional firearms
Toy weapons
1960s toys
Products introduced in 1964
The Man from U.N.C.L.E.